Amrita Patel is an Indian businessperson associated with cooperative dairy sector as well as environmentalist. She headed National Dairy Development Board from 1998 to 2014 which led the world's biggest dairy development program Operation Flood. She chaired several other institutes and has been a member of board of banks. She was awarded Padma Bhushan in 2001.

Early life
Amrita Patel was born on 13 November 1943 at 1 till 11 jan 2020 because of cancer, Safdarjung Road, New Delhi. She was the youngest among five daughters of civil servant and politician Hirubhai M. Patel and Savitaben, a Gujarati family. When her father retired, her family moved back to Anand in Gujarat in 1959. She received her higher education from Mumbai and completed her study in Bachelor of Veterinary Science and Animal Husbandry. In 1965, she joined Amul, a dairy cooperative, and was trained under Verghese Kurien.

Career
After four decades of work in Amul, she served as the chairperson of the National Dairy Development Board (NDDB) in from 1998 to 2014. As the managing director of NDDB, she led the Operation Flood, the world's biggest dairy development program.

She also became a chairperson of the Mother Dairy, Delhi; the President of Indian National Committee of the International Dairy Federation and later a member of Planning Commission of Government of Himachal Pradesh. She has been a member of the Boards of Reserve Bank of India and National Bank for Agriculture and Rural Development (NABARD).

She advocates the protection of environment and ecology. She was the chairperson of the Foundation for Ecological Security working in the field of ecology. She is  the Chairman of the Sardar Patel Renewable Energy Research Institute,  Anand as well as Charutar Arogya Mandal.

Recognition
She was awarded various awards for her contribution in development and management of dairy sector including the Financial Express Lifetime Achievement Award, Jawaharlal Nehru Birth Centenary Award for Nation Building (1999-2000), World Dairy Expo’s International Person of the Year (1997), Indian Dairy Association Fellowship, Krishimitra Award, Foundation National Award from Fuel Injection Engineering Company, Sahkarita Bandhu Award, Borlaug Award (1991),  Indira Gandhi Paryavaran Puraskar (2005), Mahindra Samriddhi Krishi Shiromani Samman (Lifetime Achievement Award, 2016).

The Government of India awarded her Padma Bhushan, the third highest civilian award of India, in 2001.

References

Recipients of the Padma Bhushan in trade and industry
Businesspeople from Gujarat
Businesswomen from Gujarat
Living people
1943 births
Indian women educational theorists
20th-century Indian educational theorists
20th-century Indian businesswomen
20th-century Indian businesspeople
21st-century Indian businesswomen
21st-century Indian businesspeople
People from Anand district
Indian ecologists
Indian environmentalists
20th-century women educators